Thomas John Skeyhill (1895-1932) was born in 1895 to Annie and James Percy Skeyhill in Terang, Victoria. He was a signaler in the Australian Army in World War I. On 8 May, during the advance at Cape Helles, he was blinded by an exploding Turkish shell. He ghostwrote an account about Alvin York, which was later made into a movie of the same name in 1941. He was killed in a plane crash at Barnstable Municipal Airport and was buried with military honors in West Dennis, Massachusetts, where he had a summer home.

“Halt! Thy tread is on heroes' graves

Australian lads lie sleeping below:

Just rough wooden crosses at their heads

To let their comrades know.

They'd sleep no better for marble slabs,

Nor monuments so grand

They lie content, now their day is done

In that far-off foreign land.”

Tom Skeyhill

References

Further reading
 

1895 births
1932 deaths
Australian Army soldiers
People from Dennis, Massachusetts
People from Victoria (Australia)